Don McManus (born November 8, 1959) (sometimes credited as Don R. McManus) is an American character actor of film and television. He became better known after his performance as Duncan in the Seinfeld episode "The Race". Born in San Diego, California, he is a graduate of Yale University.

Career 
McManus's film credits include Vice, Grand Piano, Under the Silver Lake, The Maze Runner, Lucky Bastard, Lovelace, Dark Around the Stars, For A Good Time, Call, Magnolia, The Shawshank Redemption, Under the Tuscan Sun, National Treasure, Hannibal, Air Force One, and The Congress.

His TV credits include Sorry For Your Loss, Mom, Supernatural, Castle, Justified, The Newsroom, 24, Northern Exposure, Franklin & Bash, NCIS, Private Practice, Parks and Recreation, Boston Legal, Grey's Anatomy, Dexter, Seinfeld, Frasier, Nip/Tuck, The Closer, CSI, Party of Five, Mad About You, Ally McBeal, Star Trek: Voyager, Malcolm in the Middle, Forever (2014 TV series), and Dr. Quinn, Medicine Woman.

Selected filmography

The Care Bears Adventure in Wonderland (1987) as The Caterpillar
The Bonfire of the Vanities (1990) as Bondsman
True Colors (1991) as Doug Stubblefield
Josh and S.A.M. (1993) as Calgary Airline Ofiicer
The Shawshank Redemption (1994) as Guard Wiley
Seinfeld (1994, TV Series) as Duncan Meyer
Air Force One (1997) as F-15 Leader Colonel Carlton
I'm Losing You (1998) as Jake Horowitz
Zack and Reba (1998) as Reverend Poole
Magnolia (1999) as Dr. Landon
Dropping Out (2000) as Mr. Flemington
The 6th Day (2000) as RePet Salesman
Hannibal (2001) as Asst. Mayor Benny Holcombe
Punch-Drunk Love (2002) as Plastic (voice)
Auto Focus (2002) as Priest
Under the Tuscan Sun (2003) as Nasty Man
National Treasure (2004) as Dr. Stan Herbert
Underclassman (2005) as Julian Reynolds
Ocean's Thirteen (2007) as Neil - The Pit Boss
Choose Connor (2007) as Daniel Norris
The Onion Movie (2008) as Dennis McCormick
The Coverup (2008) as Carl Rauff
Killshot (2008) as Nelson Davies
Kill Theory (2009) as Dr. Karl Truftin
Just Peck (2009) as Mr. Trustman
Cirque du Freak: The Vampire's Assistant (2009) as Mr. Shan
Little Fish, Strange Pond (2009) as Dennis Rivers
Letters from the Big Man (2011) as Forest Superintendent
Low Fidelity (2011) as Dick
For a Good Time, Call... (2012) as Scott Powell
Lovelace (2013) as Arty Shapiro
The Congress (2013) as Reeve Bobs (uncredited)
Dark Around the Stars (2013) as Brian
Grand Piano (2013) as Norman Reisinger
Under the Hollywood Sign (2014) as Robert
The Perfect 46 (2014) as Steve Heisman
Lucky Bastard (2014) as Mike
The Maze Runner (2014) as Masked Man
Grandma (2015) as Dad
Life is Strange (2015) as David Madsen
Park City (2015) as Charley
Paranormal Activity: The Ghost Dimension (2015) as Kent
Under the Silver Lake (2018) as Final Man
Vice (2018) as David Addington

References

External links

Living people
American male film actors
American male television actors
Male actors from San Diego
1959 births